Matthew Jones was an Anglican priest in Ireland in the 17th century.

Jones was born in Wales and educated at Trinity College, Dublin. He was the incumbent at Youghal; and Archdeacon of Lismore from 1684 to 1685.

His brother was Bishop of Cloyne from 1682 to 1692; and Bishop of St Asaph from 1692 to 1703.

References

Alumni of Trinity College Dublin
Archdeacons of Lismore
17th-century Irish Anglican priests